The 1986–87 NBA season was the Nuggets' 11th season in the NBA and 20th season as a franchise.

In the playoffs, the Nuggets were swept by the eventual NBA champion Los Angeles Lakers in three games in the First Round.

Draft picks

Roster

Regular season

Season standings

z - clinched division title
y - clinched division title
x - clinched playoff spot

Record vs. opponents

Game log

Playoffs

|- align="center" bgcolor="#ffcccc"
| 1
| April 23
| @ L.A. Lakers
| L 95–128
| Blair Rasmussen (26)
| Blair Rasmussen (13)
| Fat Lever (9)
| The Forum17,505
| 0–1
|- align="center" bgcolor="#ffcccc"
| 2
| April 25
| @ L.A. Lakers
| L 127–139
| Fat Lever (26)
| Fat Lever (10)
| Fat Lever (9)
| The Forum17,297
| 0–2
|- align="center" bgcolor="#ffcccc"
| 3
| April 29
| L.A. Lakers
| L 103–140
| Alex English (25)
| Wayne Cooper (12)
| Alex English (6)
| McNichols Sports Arena15,137
| 0–3
|-

Player statistics

Season

Playoffs

Awards and records
 Lafayette Lever, All-NBA Second Team

Transactions

References

See also
 1986-87 NBA season

Denver Nuggets seasons
Denver
Denver Nugget
Denver Nugget